Perelle or Pérelle is a surname, and may refer to:

 Adam Perelle (1640–1695), French artist and writer, son of Gabriel Perelle
 Auguste Jubé de La Perelle (1765–1824), French general, politician and historiographer
 Gabriel Perelle (1604–1677), French draftsman and printmaker of topographic views and landscapes
 Nicolas Perelle (1631–1695), French painter and engraver, son of Gabriel Perelle

See also
 SS Perelle